Triadelphia may refer to:

 Triadelphia, Ohio, an unincorporated community
 Triadelphia, West Virginia 
 Triadelphia Reservoir - Maryland
 Triadelphia Middle School